46 Aquilae is a star in the constellation of Aquila, located to the north of Tarazed (γ Aquilae). 46 Aquilae is its Flamsteed designation. It is a dim, blue-white hued star that is a challenge to view with the naked eye, having an apparent visual magnitude of 6.33. This object is located approximately 830 light years from the Sun, based on parallax. It is moving closer to the Earth with a heliocentric radial velocity of −25 km/s.

This body has a stellar classification of B9 III, matching a late B-type giant star. It is a chemically peculiar star of a weak Mercury-Manganese type (CP3), and is the most chromium–deficient star known. It is radiating 180 times the luminosity of the Sun from its photosphere at an effective temperature of 12,900 K.

References 

B-type giants
Aquila (constellation)
Durchmusterung objects
Aquilae, 46
186122
096931
7493